HD 143361 b is an extrasolar planet located approximately 194 light-years away in the constellation of Norma, orbiting the 9th magnitude G-type main sequence star HD 143361. This planet has a minimum mass of 3.0 times that of Jupiter. Because the inclination is not known, the true mass is not known. This planet orbits at a distance of 2.0 AU with an orbital eccentricity of 0.18.

This object was detected using the radial velocity method during an astronomical survey conducted by the Magellan Planet Search Program using the MIKE echelle spectrograph on the 6.5-m Magellan II (Clay) telescope.

References

External links
 

Exoplanets discovered in 2008
Giant planets
Norma (constellation)
Exoplanets detected by radial velocity